Scott King may refer to:

Scott King (artist) (born 1969)
Scott King (ice hockey, born 1967), Canadian ice hockey goaltender who played with the Detroit Red Wings
Scott King (ice hockey, born 1977), Canadian professional ice hockey player
Scott L. King, mayor of Gary, Indiana from 1996 to 2006

See also
Coretta Scott King (1927–2006), American author, activist, and civil rights leader
Scott-King's Modern Europe, novella published in 1947 by Evelyn Waugh